Clube Olímpico do Montijo is a Portuguese football club based in Montijo. Founded in 2007, it currently competes in the Campeonato de Portugal, holding home games at Campo da Liberdade, with a 3,000 capacity.

History
Clube Olímpico do Montijo was founded on 11 July 2007 after the extinction of the historical Clube Desportivo do Montijo that disputed by three times the Portuguese First League (in the 70's)

The club competes in the Campeonato de Portugal (league), the third tier of the Portuguese football league system and is affiliated to Setúbal Football Association.

Montijo became the First Division district champion of the Setúbal Football Association in 2016/2017.

In the season 2017/2018, Montijo played in the Portuguese Championship (Series E) under the command of David Martins, and managed the club in the third tier of Portuguese football, with a ninth place in the final classification, which earned them the participation in the D Series of the 2018–19 Campeonato de Portugal.

On January 17, 2019, Olímpico do Montijo board announced that Mia Chunyan is the new investor and President of the Board of Directors of the Montijo-Futebol Olympic Club, SAD.

The Olímpico do Montijo has as great rival the Grupo Desportivo Alcochetense due to the great proximity (6km) between the two cities, but due to the number of matches played, Montijo has so-called classic games, the FC Barreirense, Amora Futebol Clube, Atlético Clube de Portugal and Clube Oriental de Lisboa.

Gallery

Current squad

External links
 Zerozero team profile
 Federação Portuguesa de Futebol, Campeonato de Portugal Prio
 at ForaDeJogo team profile

Football clubs in Portugal
Sport in Montijo, Portugal
Association football clubs established in 2007
2007 establishments in Portugal